The spada da lato (Italian) or side-sword is a type of sword popular during the late 16th century.
It is a continuation of the medieval knightly sword, and the immediate predecessor (or early form) of the rapier of the early modern period. 
Its use was taught in the  Dardi school of Italian fencing, and was influential on the classical rapier fencing of the 17th century. The equivalent Spanish term, espada ropera ("dress sword") is the origin of the term rapier.
Italian antiquarians use the term spada da lato for rapiers typical of the period of c. 1560–1630, 
the Italian term for the fully developed rapier of the later 17th century is spada da lato striscia, or just spada striscia "strip-sword".

This sword design eventually led to the development of the civilian rapier, but it was not replaced by it, and the side-sword continued to be used during the rapier's lifetime. 
Although this particular type of sword is referred to in modern times as a side-sword, the name was not used contemporaneously to the sword in question (according to the current research of ancient fighting manuals). Although some early Italian sources use the term spada da lato, they are only talking about the sword that is at one's side, and not just this particular type of sword.

References

Renaissance-era swords